Dabney dos Santos Souza (born 31 July 1996) is a Dutch professional footballer who plays as an attacking midfielder for AS Trenčín.

Career
Dos Santos joined AZ in 2009 from Zeeburgia. He made his Eredivisie debut on 25 October 2014 against FC Groningen replacing Thom Haye after 60 minutes in a 2–2 home draw. On 4 January 2018, he joined Sparta Rotterdam in a loan deal.

On 30 August 2018, he signed a two-year contract with Heracles Almelo with an additional one-year extension option.

After his contract expired with Heracles, he joined Moldovan club Sheriff Tiraspol on 4 September 2020.

Personal life
Dos Santos is of Cape Verdean descent.

Career statistics

Notes

References

External links
 Netherlands profile at OnsOranje
 
 Profile at Voetbal International
 

1996 births
Living people
Dutch sportspeople of Cape Verdean descent
Dutch footballers
Footballers from Amsterdam
Association football wingers
Netherlands under-21 international footballers
Netherlands youth international footballers
Eredivisie players
Eerste Divisie players
Moldovan Super Liga players
A.V.V. Zeeburgia players
AZ Alkmaar players
Jong AZ players
Sparta Rotterdam players
Heracles Almelo players
FC Sheriff Tiraspol players
AS Trenčín players
Dutch expatriate footballers
Dutch expatriate sportspeople in Moldova
Expatriate footballers in Moldova
Dutch expatriate sportspeople in Slovakia
Expatriate footballers in Slovakia